Agassiz is a small community located in the Eastern Fraser Valley region of British Columbia, Canada, about 97 kilometres east of Vancouver and 24 kilometres north-east of the city of Chilliwack.  The only town within the jurisdiction of the District Municipality of Kent, it contains the majority of Kent's population.

History
The land on the Fraser that is now called Agassiz was once the location of villages of the First Nation Steaten people that had been wiped out by disease starting in 1782. Later, another village of former First Nation slaves settled there called Freedom Village (Halkomelem: Chi'ckim).

Agassiz was founded by Lewis Nunn Agassiz, a member of the Agassiz family.

TV drama Wayward Pines was filmed on location in the community.

Climate
Agassiz has an oceanic climate (Cfb) with warm summers with cool nights and cool, rainy winters. Mid-summer to early fall is generally the driest time of the year, with only 1 out of every 3 days on average having precipitation.

Government and infrastructure
Correctional Service of Canada (CSC) Kent Institution is in Agassiz.

Gallery

See also
Agassiz-Rosedale Bridge
Harrison Hot Springs

References

 - Total pages: 368 

Populated places in the Fraser Valley Regional District
Lower Mainland
Populated places on the Fraser River
Kent, British Columbia